The Defence Forces (officially styled ) are the armed forces of Ireland. They encompass the Army, Air Corps, Naval Service, and Reserve Defence Forces.

The Supreme Commander of the Defence Forces is the President of Ireland. All Defence Forces officers hold their commission from the President, but in practice the Minister for Defence acts on the President's behalf and reports to the Government of Ireland. The Minister for Defence is advised by the Council of Defence on the business of the Department of Defence.

As of September 2020, there were 8,529 permanent personnel in the Defence Forces, comprising 6,878 Army, 752 Air Corps and 899 Naval Service personnel.

Role
The Irish state has a long-standing policy of non-belligerence in armed conflicts, including neutrality in World War II. Ireland's military capabilities are modest. However, the state has a long history of involvement in United Nations peacekeeping operations. Functions of the Defence Forces include:

Preparation for the defence of the state against armed attack.
Assisting the police force, the Garda Síochána, including the protection of the internal security of the state.
Peacekeeping, crisis management and humanitarian relief operations in support of the United Nations.
Policing the fisheries, in accordance with the state's obligations under European Union agreements.
Miscellaneous civil contingency duties requested by the government such as search and rescue, air ambulance provision, providing secure air transport for ministers, assistance in the event of natural and other disasters, ensuring the maintenance of essential services, and assisting in dealing with oil pollution at sea.

History

The Defence Forces trace their origins to the Irish Volunteers, founded in 1913. Their official Irish-language title, Óglaigh na hÉireann, is taken from the equivalent Irish-language title of the Irish Volunteers, as are their cap badge and the buttons worn on ceremonial uniforms (the buttons are still marked with the initials "IV").

The Irish Volunteers were central to the Easter Rising staged in April 1916. After the rising, the Volunteers gave allegiance to the First Dáil, the parliament of the revolutionary Irish Republic. At this time the Volunteers became known as the Irish Republican Army (IRA). From 1919 onwards, the IRA waged a guerrilla campaign against British rule in Ireland that is now known as the War of Independence.

A truce in July 1921 brought hostilities to an end; the Anglo-Irish Treaty was signed on 6 December. The Provisional Government was then constituted on 14 January 1922. The IRA divided between those who accepted the decision of the Dáil in ratifying the Treaty and those who did not: consequently, both civil war and re-occupation by the British became possible. In February 1922, the pro-treaty IRA became the  National Army of the Irish Free State. With declining relations between the remaining units of the anti-treaty IRA and the newly recruited pro-treaty National Army, the Irish Civil War broke out on 28 June 1922. It ended in victory for the National Army when, on 24 May 1923, the anti-treaty IRA Chief of Staff, Frank Aiken ordered his volunteers to dump arms.

On 3 August 1923 the new state passed the "Defence Forces (Temporary Provisions) Act", raising "an armed force to be called Oglaigh na hEireann  (hereinafter referred to as the Forces) consisting of such number of officers, non-commissioned officers, and men as may from time to time be provided by the Oireachtas the new parliament of the Irish Free State." The Forces were established on 1 October 1924.

The state was officially neutral during World War II but declared an official state of emergency on 2 September 1939 and the Army was mobilised. As the Emergency progressed, more and newer equipment was purchased for the rapidly expanding force from Britain and the United States as well as some manufactured at home. For the duration of the Emergency, Ireland, while formally neutral, tacitly supported the Allies in several ways. Allied aircraft were allowed to access the Atlantic Ocean via the Donegal Corridor. German military personnel were interned in the Curragh along with the belligerent powers' servicemen, whereas Allied airmen and sailors who crashed in Ireland were very often repatriated, usually by secretly moving them across the border to Northern Ireland. G2, the Army's intelligence section, played a vital role in the detection and arrest of German spies, such as Hermann Görtz.

In September 1946, the Naval Service was established as Ireland's maritime force and as a permanent component of the Defence Forces.

Ireland became a member of the United Nations in 1955. The first contribution to peacekeeping was in 1958 when Army officers were assigned to the United Nations Observation Group in Lebanon (UNOGIL). Since 1958 the Defence Forces have had a continuous presence on armed United Nations peacekeeping operations, except between May 1974 to May 1978 (although they did retain overseas unarmed observer missions during this period). The first armed peacekeeping mission was to the Operation des Nations Unies au Congo (ONUC) in 1960. During the ONUC mission, a company from the Irish Army were involved in a battle at Jadotville, in which the Irish held-out against a larger Katangese force. A memorial to Irish personnel who served as United Nations peacekeepers was unveiled in 2009 in the town of Fermoy, recording that there was a total of ninety Irish fatalities while on active service with the UN until that date.

During the Troubles, the period of civil conflict centred on Northern Ireland from 1969 to 1998, the Defence Forces deployed to aid the Garda Síochána. Troops were deployed for duty to the border areas, new border military posts were established, and in 1973 new permanent border units were established. In 1974, troops were deployed to maximum-security prisons in Portlaoise and Limerick where IRA prisoners were detained. Armed troops were deployed in 1976 to all major post offices during a three-month national bank strike. In 1978, cash-in-transit escorts were established to protect large cash movements throughout the state, continuing until 2014. Tasks in military aid to the civil power continue today, but no longer to the same degree or intensity.

Organisation 

The Defence Forces are organised under the Chief of Staff, supported by Deputy Chief of Staff Operations, and the Deputy Chief of Staff Support. They consist of a Permanent Defence Force (PDF), which is a standing force and provides the main capability for military operations, and the Reserve Defence Forces (RDF), military reserve forces which support the PDF if necessary. The PDF is organised into three service branches: the Army, the Naval Service, and the Air Corps. The RDF may be further subdivided into a First Line Reserve (FLR) and a Second Line Reserve; the First Line Reserve comprises former members of the Permanent Defence Force, while the Second Line Reserve comprises an Army Reserve and a Naval Service Reserve (both recruited directly from the civilian population). A reorganization of the RDF in 2013, referred to as the "single force concept", has resulted in units of the RDF being embedded within units of the PDF, rather than existing entirely in parallel as a separate reserve force; this moves away from the traditional approach of the RDF being considered a fourth service branch of the Defence Forces.

In January 2022, the Commission on the Defence Forces recommended the establishment of an 'Information Command', under the command of a general, to handle cyberattacks and misinformation.

Army

As of mid-2016, the Army had approximately 7,300 active personnel, with 1,663 personnel in the Army Reserve. Up to late 2012 the army had three brigades: 1 Southern, 2 Eastern and 4 Western; in 2012, 4 Western Brigade stood down at its HQ Custume Barracks, Athlone. The state is now divided into two Brigade areas for administrative and operational reasons, with the former 4 Western Brigade split between the other two brigades.  In addition to the brigade structure, there is also the Defence Forces Training Centre, a logistics base in the Curragh.

The two-brigade structure envisages distinct operational areas of responsibility for each of the brigades. The 1st Brigade has primary responsibility for operational tasks in the southern region, while the 2nd Brigade leads on operational tasks in the eastern and western regions.  Practical operational considerations dictate the requirement to outline operational areas of responsibility. The brigade structure is based on strengthened combat and combat-support elements, together with streamlined combat-service-support elements.

The Army has nine specialist corps, each designated as either combat, combat support or combat service support. These are the Infantry Corps, Artillery Corps, Cavalry Corps, Engineer Corps, Ordnance Corps, Medical Corps, Transport Corps, Military Police Corps, and the Communications and Information Services Corps. In the case of corps which support the infantry, a Corps Director and staff are provided to coordinate the purchase of specialised equipment, the execution of specialised training, and other necessary activities.

Irish infantry are equipped with assault rifles, machine guns, grenade launchers, hand grenades, and anti-tank weapons. Most weapons used by their defence forces follow NATO standards and are purchased from abroad, with Ireland having a very limited arms industry. The Army has light armoured vehicles, with the primary vehicle being the MOWAG Piranha, armed with machine guns. The Army also use the FV101 Scorpion armoured reconnaissance vehicle, equipped with a 76mm low-velocity gun and a 7.62mm machine gun. Its artillery capabilities consist of 120mm mortars and 105mm light guns.

The Army Ranger Wing (ARW) are the special forces of Ireland. They are based at the Curragh.

Air Corps

The Air Corps is the air component of the Defence Forces. Its HQ is at Casement (Baldonnel) Aerodrome. The Air Corps is the smallest of the branches of the Defence Forces, with approximately 939 personnel, and its primary roles are defined as:
Support of the Army
Support of the Naval Service
Aid to the civil power

There are two secondary roles:
Aid to the civil community
Aid to government departments

The Air Corps is tasked with the traditional air-force role of defending Irish airspace; however, its practical capability to do so is severely limited and it has no aerial fighter or bomber capability at present. The Air Corps provide support to the Army and Naval Service, together with non-military air services such as the Emergency Aeromedical (air ambulance) Service, VIP transport, and search and rescue (in support of Coast Guard search and rescue efforts). The Air Corps' helicopters are the only helicopters within the state capable of flying at night in mountain terrain using night-vision technology.

The Air Corps' two CASA CN-235 maritime patrol aircraft are equipped with detection systems and assist the Naval Service in patrolling Ireland's territorial waters and exclusive economic zone. These aircraft are also used for high-altitude, low-opening parachuting by the Army's ARW. The corps has six AgustaWestland AW139 utility helicopters capable of being armed with FN MAG machine guns. These advanced helicopters can be flown using night-vision goggles and used in support of the ARW, Naval Service and Garda Síochána operations. Seven Pilatus PC-9 turboprop aircraft can be equipped with rocket pods and machine guns, and two Eurocopter EC135 light utility helicopters (which can be used as sniper platforms by the ARW) are used for training pilots and for air-ambulance missions.

The Air Corps conducted over 130 maritime surveillance patrol flights in 2019, and provided medical support to the HSE for patients by conducting over 233 Emergency Aeromedical Service missions and 32 inter-hospital air ambulance transfers.

Naval Service

The Naval Service maintains a complement of about 1,144 personnel and is tasked with patrolling Irish territorial waters as well as the Irish Conservation Box, a large area of sea in which fishing is restricted to preserve fish numbers. It is tasked with enforcing this European-Union-protected area and thus serves the EU as well as Ireland. Together with the Air Corps and Customs, it has intercepted a number of vessels carrying narcotics to and from Ireland.

The Naval Service has nine patrol vessels (1xP30, 2xP40, 2xP50, 4xP60) which are operated in support of the service's primary roles, inflatable seagoing craft, and training vessels. It maintains highly-trained armed boarding parties that can seize a vessel if necessary. In 2019, for example, there were approximately 780 boarding operations and 12 vessels were detained . The service's specialised diving unit is the Naval Service Diving Section.

The primary role is defined as "National Security", with secondary roles which include:
 Fishery protection
 Aid to the civil power
 Drug interdiction
 Maritime safety
 Diving operations
 Pollution control
 Overseas mission support

Reserve Defence Forces

The Reserve Defence Forces (RDF) in its current form was established in October 2005 and comprises the Army Reserve (AR) and Naval Service Reserve (NSR). The RDF is a part-time, voluntary component of the Defence Forces in peacetime, supporting the Permanent Defence Forces (PDF) in its domestic roles and training alongside its professional full-time colleagues as part of the "Single Force Concept" whereby RDF units are integrated with their PDF counterparts, coming under the one command. As of mid-2018, there were 1,778 reservists, with 1,663 in the Army Reserve and 115 in the Naval Service Reserve.

Representative associations
The interests of members of the Defence Forces are represented by a number of representative associations, similar to trade unions (which Irish military personnel are banned from joining). Officers of the PDF are represented by the Representative Association of Commissioned Officers, Rank-and-file members of the PDF are represented by the Permanent Defence Force Other Ranks Representative Association (PDFORRA), which is affiliated to the Irish Conference of Professional and Service Associations and to the European Organisation of Military Associations, EUROMIL.  In 2009, members of PDFORRA took part in an Irish Congress of Trade Unions protest against the government's handling of the post-2008 Irish economic downturn, at which time the Department of Defence warned that Defence Forces members could not take part in or sponsor any "public agitation", and that PDFORRA had "no express permission" for members to take part in the protests. All ranks of the RDF are represented by the Reserve Defence Forces Representative Association (RDFRA).

Complaints concerning and made by serving and former members of the Defence Forces can be investigated by the independent Office of the Ombudsman for the Defence Forces (ODF), in cases where internal grievance procedures within the DF have been exhausted.

Bases

The Defence Forces operate a number of military bases:

See also
 Military awards and decorations of Ireland
Politics of the Republic of Ireland
Ireland–NATO relations
History of Ireland
Irish Veterans
List of countries by military expenditures
Irish Army deafness claims – a series of 17,000 personal injury claims taken by members of the Irish Defence Forces.
Defence Force
List of wars involving the Republic of Ireland

Notes

References

External links

Military.ie – Official website

 
Department of Defence (Ireland)
Permanent Structured Cooperation